Atkarsk is a town in Saratov Oblast, Russia, located at the confluence of the Atkara and Medveditsa Rivers,  northwest of Saratov, the administrative center of the oblast. Population:

History
It was founded in place of a Tatar settlement at the mouth of the Atkara River. Town status was granted to it in 1781.

Administrative and municipal status
Within the framework of administrative divisions, Atkarsk serves as the administrative center of Atkarsky District, even though it is not a part of it. As an administrative division, it is incorporated separately as Atkarsk Town Under Oblast Jurisdiction—an administrative unit with the status equal to that of the districts. As a municipal division, Atkarsk Town Under Oblast Jurisdiction is incorporated within Atkarsky Municipal District as Atkarsk Urban Settlement.

Notable people
Russian pop singer Valeriya was born here in 1968.

References

Notes

Sources

External links
Official website of Atkarsk 
Directory of organizations in Atkarsk 

Cities and towns in Saratov Oblast
Atkarsky Uyezd